Utricularia radiata, the little floating bladderwort, is a medium-sized suspended aquatic carnivorous plant that belongs to the genus Utricularia. U. radiata is endemic to North America.

See also 
 List of Utricularia species

References 

Carnivorous plants of North America
Flora of the Eastern United States
radiata